Aleksandr Grigoryevich Zarkhi (18 February 1908 – 27 January 1997) was a Soviet and Russian film director and screenwriter. People's Artist of the USSR (1969). Hero of Socialist Labour (1978).

His film Twenty Six Days from the Life of Dostoyevsky was nominated for the Golden Bear at the 31st Berlin International Film Festival in 1981.

Filmography
 The Song of Metal (Песнь о металле) (1928); documentary
 Wind in the Face (Ветер в лицо) (1930); co-directed with Iosif Kheifits
 Noon (Полдень) (1931); co-directed with Iosif Kheifits
 My Motherland (Моя Родина) (1933); co-directed with Iosif Kheifits
 Hectic Days (Горячие денечки) (1935); co-directed with Iosif Kheifits
 Baltic Deputy (Депутат Балтики) (1937); co-directed with Iosif Kheifits
 Member of the Government (Член правительства) (1940); co-directed with Iosif Kheifits
 His Name Is Sukhe-Bator (Его зовут Сухэ-Батор) (1942); co-directed with Iosif Kheifits
 The Last Hill (Малахов курган)(1944); co-directed with Iosif Kheifits
 In the Name of Life (Во имя жизни) (1946); co-directed with Iosif Kheifits
 The Precious Seed (Драгоценные зерна) (1948); co-directed with Iosif Kheifits
 The Fires of Baku (Огни Баку) (1950); co-directed with Iosif Kheifits and Rza Tahmasib
 Kolkhoz Rassvet (Колхоз "Рассвет") (1951); documentary
 Pavlinka (Павлинка) (1952); TV play
 Nesterka (Нестерка) (1954)
 The Height (Высота) (1957)
 People on the Bridge (Люди на мосту) (1960)
 My Younger Brother (Мой младший брат) (1962)
 Hello, Life! (1963)
 Anna Karenina (Анна Каренина) (1967)
 Towns and Years (Города и годы) (1973)
 Story of an Unknown Actor (Повесть о неизвестном актере) (1976)
 Twenty Six Days from the Life of Dostoyevsky (Двадцать шесть дней из жизни Достоевского) (1981)
 Chicherin (Чичерин) (1986)

Awards and honours
 Three Orders of the Red Banner of Labour (1940)
 Two Stalin Prizes (1941, 1946)
People's Artist of the RSFSR (1965)
People's Artist of the USSR (1969)
Hero of Socialist Labour (1978)
Order of Lenin (1978)
Order of the October Revolution (1986)

References

External links
 

1908 births
1997 deaths
20th-century Russian screenwriters
20th-century Russian male writers
Mass media people from Saint Petersburg
People from Sankt-Peterburgsky Uyezd
Academic staff of High Courses for Scriptwriters and Film Directors
Heroes of Socialist Labour
People's Artists of the RSFSR
People's Artists of the USSR
Stalin Prize winners
Recipients of the Order of Lenin
Recipients of the Order of the Red Banner of Labour
Male screenwriters
Russian Jews
Russian film directors
Russian male writers
Soviet film directors
Soviet male writers
Soviet screenwriters

Burials at Novodevichy Cemetery